Saumendra Kumar Ghose (born 1964) is the current Mayor of the city of Cuttack, the capital of the Indian state of Odisha.

References

Living people
People from Cuttack
1964 births
Mayors of places in Odisha
Odisha municipal councillors
Biju Janata Dal politicians